Kimsbury hill fort, also known as Castle Godwyn, Kimsbury Camp, Painswick Beacon or Painswick hill fort is an Iron Age hill fort on Painswick Beacon near Painswick in the Cotswolds, Gloucestershire England. The interior has been extensively quarried and parts are now a golf course, but much remains of the ramparts. Though there have been problems of erosion.

The hill fort has been dated to the first century BCE and is a scheduled monument. Pottery, coins and other archaeological finds have been found dating from the Iron Age through to the 3rd century CE in the Roman era.

References

Hill forts in Gloucestershire
Scheduled monuments in Gloucestershire
Painswick